The 1964 Boston Patriots season was the franchise's 5th season in the American Football League. The Patriots ended the season with a record of ten wins, three losses, and one tie, and finished second in the AFL's Eastern Division.

Staff

Game-by-game results

Standings

Roster 

LB		Tom Addison

DT		Houston Antwine

LB *Nick Buoniconti

HB		Ron Burton

WR/K/DB		Gino Cappelletti

DB		Dave Cloutier

WR		Jim Colclough

FB/HB		Jim Crawford

DE/DT		Bob Dee

T/DT		Jerry DeLucca

LB		Mike Dukes

DE		Larry Eisenhauer

LB		Lonnie Farmer

DB		Dick Felt

HB		J.D. Garrett

HB		Larry Garron

WR		Art Graham

DB		Ron Hall

T Ray Lardani

DT/DE		Jim Hunt

T/G		Charley Long

LB/C		Don McKinnon

C		Jon Morris

G		Billy Neighbors

T/DT		Don Oakes

DB		Ross O'Hanley

QB		Babe Parilli

DT		Jess Richardson

TE		Tony Romeo

LB		Jack Rudolph

C/T/G		Bob Schmidt

DB		Chuck Shonta

WR		Al Snyder

TE/DB		Thomas Stephens

G		Len St. Jean

G		Dave Watson

DB		Don Webb

T/C		Bob Yates

QB/P/HB		Tom Yewcic

TE Nick Marchese

References 

Boston Patriots
New England Patriots seasons
Boston Patriots
1960s in Boston